Joseph Whiteside (4 August 1906 – 11 October 1990) was an English competition swimmer who represented Great Britain in the Olympics, and England in the British Empire Games, during the late 1920s and early 1930s.  White competed in freestyle swimming events.

At the 1928 Summer Olympics in Amsterdam, Netherlands, he was a member of the British men's team that finished sixth in the 4×200-metre freestyle relay. Four years later at the 1932 Summer Olympics in Los Angeles, he finished fifth with the British team in the 4×200-metre freestyle relay.  In the 100 metre freestyle contest he was eliminated in the first round. At the 1930 Empire Games he won the silver medal with the English team in 4×200-yard freestyle relay competition. In the 400-yard freestyle he finished fourth.

See also
 List of Commonwealth Games medallists in swimming (men)

References
Joseph Whiteside's profile at Sports Reference.com

English male freestyle swimmers
Olympic swimmers of Great Britain
Swimmers at the 1928 Summer Olympics
Swimmers at the 1932 Summer Olympics
Swimmers at the 1930 British Empire Games
Commonwealth Games silver medallists for England
Commonwealth Games medallists in swimming
1906 births
1990 deaths
Medallists at the 1930 British Empire Games